The Standing Commission for Maritime Accident and Incident Investigations (CIAIM) is an agency of the Spanish government that investigates maritime accidents and incidents. It is a division of the Ministry of Public Works and Transport. Its head office is in Madrid.

See also

 Civil Aviation Accident and Incident Investigation Commission
 Comisión de Investigación de Accidentes Ferroviarios

References

External links
 Maritime Accident and Incident Investigation Commission - Official website 
 Standing Commission for Maritime Accident and Incident Investigations

Water transport in Spain
Government of Spain
Maritime safety organizations
Maritime incidents in Spain